The Ballenger Building, also known as G.F. Troxell Furniture Store, Taylor Music and Furniture Co., and Safeway, is a historic commercial building located in downtown Columbia, Missouri.  It was originally built about 1892, and expanded rearward about 1904.  It was extensively remodeled in 1928. It is a two-story brick building on a stone foundation.  It features terra cotta ornamentation and Chicago school style windows. Today it holds Kaldi's Coffee House.

It was listed on the National Register of Historic Places in 2004.

References

Commercial buildings on the National Register of Historic Places in Missouri
Commercial buildings completed in 1928
Buildings and structures in Columbia, Missouri
National Register of Historic Places in Columbia, Missouri
National Register of Historic Places in Boone County, Missouri
Chicago school architecture in Missouri